Araldo Caprili (10 September 1920 – 9 January 1982) was an Italian professional football player.

References

External links
Profile at Enciclopediadelcalcio.it

1920 births
1982 deaths
People from Viareggio
Italian footballers
Serie A players
Juventus F.C. players
S.S.D. Lucchese 1905 players
Spezia Calcio players
U.S. Città di Pontedera players
Association football defenders
Footballers from Tuscany
Sportspeople from the Province of Lucca